Olliffiella is a genus of gall-like scale insects in the family Kermesidae. There are at least two described species in Olliffiella.

Species
These two species belong to the genus Olliffiella:
 Olliffiella cristicola Cockerell, 1896 (gall kermes)
 Olliffiella secunda Ferris, 1955

References

Articles created by Qbugbot
Kermesidae
Sternorrhyncha genera